Ilanz/Glion is a municipality in the Surselva Region in the Swiss canton of Graubünden.  On 1 January 2014 the former municipalities of Castrisch, Ilanz, Ladir, Luven, Pitasch, Riein, Ruschein, Schnaus, Sevgein, Duvin, Pigniu, Rueun, and Siat merged into the new municipality of Ilanz/Glion.

History
Castrisch is first mentioned in 765 as Castrices.  Ladir is first mentioned about 850 as Leitura.  Luven is first mentioned in 765 as Lobene.  Pitasch is first mentioned about 801–50 as Pictaui though this comes from a 16th-century copy of the lost original.  In 960 it was mentioned as in Pictaso.  Riein is first mentioned in 765 as Renino.  In 960 it was mentioned as Raine.  Ruschein is first mentioned in 765 as Rucene.  Schnaus is first mentioned about 840 as Scanaues.  Sevgein is first mentioned about 840 as Soviene.  Duvin is first mentioned about 840 as Auna.  In 1290 it was mentioned as Aiuns.  Rueun is first mentioned in 765  as Ruane.  Until 1943 Rueun was known as Ruis.  Siat is first mentioned about 840 as Septe.  Until 1943 Siat was known as Seth.

Ilanz
Ilanz is first mentioned in 765 as Iliande.  Ilanz became the capital of the newly formed Grey League in 1395. The Grey League was the second of Three Leagues which eventually formed canton Graubünden. Johannes von Ilanz, the Abbott of Disentis, was among the three nobles instrumental in creating this "eternal alliance."

Ilanz has a special place in the history of the Protestant Reformation.  In the 1520s, the Diet of Ilanz declared that citizens of the Three Leagues should be free to choose between Catholicism and the Protestant forms of Christianity rising to the fore.   These and other events resulted in a counter-reformation within the Swiss Confederation that reversed many of the gains of the Reformation in Switzerland.

Pigniu
Pigniu was probably settled from Andiast. The name Pingyow first appears in 1403. The German name Panix is first mentioned in 1522.  Until 1984 Pigniu was known as Pigniu/Panix.

The Church of St. Valentin was dedicated in 1465 and was a popular goal of pilgrimages. Until 1667, Pigniu had its parish.

On 7 October 1799, the Russian Army under command of Field Marshal Suvorov crossed the Pigniu pass.

Geography

Demographics

The historical population is given in the following chart:

Weather
Ilanz has an average of 112.6 days of rain per year and on average receives  of precipitation. During this month there is precipitation for an average of 11.4 days. The month with the most days of precipitation is June, with an average of 11.5, but with only  of precipitation.

Pigniu has an average of 166.3 days of rain or snow per year and on average receives  of precipitation. During this month there is precipitation for an average of 16 days. The month with the most days of precipitation is May, with an average of 16.6, but with only  of rain or snow.

Sights

The village Church of St. Zeno in Ladir was first mentioned in 998.  The choir wall paintings are worth seeing.  Additionally, the municipality has an excellent view of the surrounding mountains and valleys.  The ruins of Grüneck Castle (Ruine Grüneck), destroyed before 1544, are visible today in Ilanz village.

Heritage sites of national significance
The Church of S. Margreta and the Church of S. Martin in Ilanz along with the Swiss Reformed Church building in Pitasch are listed as Swiss heritage sites of national significance.

The Reformed Church in Pitasch was built in the mid-12th century into its current form.  The church floorplan is a single nave church with a single half-round apse.  The interior murals date to about 1420, and on the exterior south wall is a mural of St. Martin and St. Christopher from the studio of the unknown Waltensburg Master which was painted about 1340.

Other sites
The ruins of Grüneck Castle (Ruine Grüneck), destroyed before 1544, are visible today. A Carolingian hoard of two ornately decorated salt containers and coins was discovered near the ruins of the castle in 1811. One of the containers, which is made from antler and T-shaped, is now kept in the British Museum. A hoard of forty Carolingian gold coins, including nine denier, known as the Ilanz Hoard was discovered near the castle in 1904. In addition to the Carolingian coins, the horde contained Lombard and Arab coins. About 142 coins from discoveries near the castle are kept at the Rätisches Museum in Chur.

Transportation

References

External links

 
Cities in Switzerland
Cultural property of national significance in Graubünden
Populated places on the Rhine